"Funkopolis" is a song by the American industrial rock group Die Warzau. It is the first single released in support of their second album Big Electric Metal Bass Face.

Formats and track listing 
All songs written by Van Christie and Jim Marcus
US U-matic (YESX 2)
"Funkopolis" (Remix) – 5:24

US CD single (865 655-2)
"Funkopolis" – 3:57
"Funkopolis" (Funkaphobia) – 5:08
"Funkopolis" (Le Funk) – 4:04
"Funkopolis" (To Le Funk) – 7:35
"Funkopolis" (Funk To Be Had) – 5:38
"Funkopolis" (Le Blanc Funk) – 5:12
"Funkopolis" (Funked Up) – 4:01

US 12" single (0-85978)
"Funkopolis" (Funk To Be Had Mix) – 5:39
"Funkopolis" (Funkaphobia Mix) – 5:09
"Funkopolis" (LP Version) – 4:00
"Funkopolis" (Le Blanc Funk Mix) – 5:12
"Funkopolis" (To Le Funk Mix) – 7:36
"Aye Corrido" – 4:17

US 12" single (FICSX 40 P1)
"Funkopolis" – 3:57
"Funkopolis" (Funkaphobia) – 5:08
"Funkopolis" (Le Funk) – 4:04
"Funkopolis" (To Le Funk) – 7:35

UK 12" single (FICSX 40 P1)
"Funkopolis – 3:57
"Funkopolis" (Funkaphobia) – 5:08
"Funkopolis" (Le Funk) – 4:04
"Funkopolis" (To Le Funk) – 7:35
"Funkopolis" (Funk To Be Had) – 5:38
"Funkopolis" (Le Blanc Funk) – 5:12
"Funkopolis" (Funked Up) – 4:01
"Shock Box" – 3:29

Charts

Personnel
Adapted from the Funkopolis liner notes.

Die Warzau
 Van Christie – guitar, keyboards, sampler, programming, production, engineering (1, 3–5, 8)
 Jim Marcus – lead vocals, drums, percussion, electronics, horns, production

Additional performers
 Keith LeBlanc – remixing (2, 6, 7)

Production and design
 Mike Rogers – engineering (1, 3–5, 8)

Release history

References

External links 
 

1991 songs
1991 singles
Die Warzau songs
Atlantic Records singles
Fiction Records singles